Awaken is the fourth studio album by contemporary Christian music singer Natalie Grant. It was released on March 22, 2005, by Curb Records.

Critical reception

AllMusics Johnny Loftus claimed, "Though strong, the melodies on Awaken sometimes feel recycled, and its manicured instrumentation lessens the power of Grant's singing voice. But the album is still a capable blend of Christian themes with mainstream pop texture, meaning it deserves the same accolades Deeper Life received."

David McCreary of CCM said, "Confession time: As soon as I was assigned to review Natalie Grant's new CD, a not-so-flattering, preconceived notion came to mind. Isn't she just another generic-sounding pop diva? But after just one spin of her aptly titled Awaken disc, that thought was quickly relegated to 'oh-so-mistaken' status. Following an eye-opening overseas journey and a recent time of spiritual introspection, Grant now releases her most poignant and intimately reflective project to date. Musically and lyrically, Awaken propels Grant to an artistic pinnacle that should give her some much-deserved street cred. Whether it's through the powerhouse praise evidenced on the CD's title track or the piano-driven disclosure of 'The Real Me', the album's evocative arrangements convey the heart of someone who confronts reality head on and embraces social responsibility as an integral part of her faith. One hard-hitting issue Grant tackles is the harrowing problem of human trafficking, not exactly standard Christian music material. But after traveling to India and visiting the appalling red-light district there, Grant was shaken by the experience. Her cathartic rally cry of sorts is found on 'Home', a compelling magnum opus featuring the Prague Philharmonic Orchestra. Further admonition comes on 'What Are You Waiting For', a catchy, up-tempo track that issues an alert to Christians to abandon complacency and make a meaningful difference for eternity. Other weighty themes emerge, including self-esteem ('Make Me Over') and personal tragedy ('Held'). Also memorable is gospel-tinged selection 'Bring It All Together', a soul-stirring duet about restoration beautifully executed with country music legend Wynonna Judd. Throughout the disc, Grant's robust vocal delivery shines through brilliantly. Moreover, full-bodied instrumentation and solid production enhance an already stellar effort. Clearly her finest performance, this release certainly bodes well for Grant's continued fruitfulness."

Cross Rhythmss Stuart Blackburn left a more unfavorable review, writing, "Natalie Grant has experienced some recognition Stateside with Dove nominations and all that. It is only fair to acknowledge that she has understood well the tastes of her home constituents. However, this side of the pond we will need more convincing. After a pointless intro track (fashionable these days), Awaken gets out of bed with a generous slice of power pop. The comparison with Superchick and the like is inevitable. Even so, with Natalie's versatile vocals and rock chick aspirations this album makes a promising start. Then begins the drift to the middle of the road. Clearly her producer secured a good deal with a string orchestra in the Czech Republic. Its lush sounds adorn much of the rest of the album, as Natalie's voice becomes increasingly dramatic and overproduction smooths away any musical edge. Ironically herein lies 'The Real Me' which is the strongest tune of the lot. It is a piano and strings affair, a considerable departure from the album's original musical direction. Just to ensure something for everyone, the penultimate track is a six minute gospel extravaganza featuring country music star Wynonna Judd. It is a pity that Natalie didn't have the courage to pursue her opening rock convictions but then we are talking Tennessee."

Shaun Stevenson of JesusFreakHideout remarked. "This time around, Natalie Grant has really outdone herself. The songwriting is superb, despite slightly formulaic at moments, and her vocal prowess shines through every high note. If you're a fan of Natalie Grant, or of ballads or soft rock, then Awaken might just be the perfect choice."

The Phantom Tollbooths Michael Dalton declared, "Awaken is an appropriate title for the latest recording from Natalie Grant. It reflects the change in her life and serves as a challenge to her audience. The catalyst for it all was an episode from her favorite TV program Law & Order. In a dramatic way it showed the horrors of human trafficking—the trade of persons across borders or within a country for the most inhumane, involuntary servitude. What Natalie saw stirred her to not only do something but gave her a passion to live more fully to extend her boundaries as a believer and an artist. Her new passion comes through loud and clear on Awaken. Like a number of Christian artists of late, her music on this release takes on a harder edge. She moves further from big voice, adult contemporary music toward a more modern rock/pop sophistication. The singing, the musicianship, the production, and the artistry are all first-rate. Many of the songs on Awaken are about living life to the fullest. About half of them are co-written by Grant, just another indicator of how much she has come into her own on this recording. Grant is bound to make new fans with this recording while retaining those who already appreciate her work. Awaken deserves a wide audience, and her work to help victims of modern day slavery is worthy of support."

Track listing

Charts

Certifications

Release history

Awards
Awaken was nominated for Pop/Contemporary Album of the Year at the 37th GMA Dove Awards. The album's second single, "Held", was nominated for Song of the Year.

References

2005 albums
Curb Records albums
Natalie Grant albums